Survival of the Fastest is the first album by the Irish thrash metal band Gama Bomb. The album was released on the European music label Witches Brew in 2006, after an initial 2005 self-release.

Track listing 
All lyrics and music written by Gama Bomb except "Bullet Belt" (music by Kevy Canavan, lyrics by Gama Bomb).

Bonus tracks 
"The Survival Option" – 2:11
"M.A.D." – 2:34

These were originally released on the band's 2004 single "The Fatal Mission" and were not included on the 2005 limited-release version of the album.

Band members 
 Philly Byrne – lead vocal
 Joe McGuigan – bass guitar and backing vocal
 Luke Graham – guitar
 Kevy Canavan – lead guitar
 Damien Boyce – drums on "M.A.D" and "The Survival Option"
 Ronan Fitzpatrick – drums on everything else

External links 
 Witches Brew

2006 debut albums
Gama Bomb albums